Trip is a Finnish brand of juice produced and distributed by Marli. Launched in 1962, Trip was the first beverage in Finland to be sold in a laminated carton. Originally Trip cartons were pyramid shaped, but were changed to a cuboid shape in the 1990s and were made higher and more narrow in 2002 to better fit children hands. Trip is usually drunk using the straw attached to its packaging.

See also
Juicebox (container)

External links
 Packing: raspberry, pear, mixed fruits, orange-cola, orange, wild strawberry
 Product page by Marli

Juice brands
Finnish brands
Finnish drinks